Bannerman is a patronymic Scottish surname. Notable people with the surname include:

Alexander Bannerman (1788–1864), British colonial governor
Alick Bannerman (1854–1924), Australian Test cricketer 
Anne Bannerman (1765–1829), Scottish poet
Celia Bannerman (born 1944), English actress
Charles Bannerman (1851–1930), scorer of a century in the very first cricket Test match
Christopher Bannerman, Canadian-born British academic, choreographer and dancer
David Armitage Bannerman (1886-1979), British ornithologist
Edmund Bannerman (1832–1903), journalist, newspaper proprietor and lawyer in the British colony of the Gold Coast; third son of James Bannerman
Helen Bannerman (1862–1946), author of Little Black Sambo
Hugh Bannerman (1887–1917), New Zealand cricketer, journalist and soldier
Ian Bannerman, actor who portrayed Deadly Earnest on TEN-10 from 1966 to 1970.
James Bannerman (1790–1858), Fanti Governor of the Gold Coast, the son of a Fanti woman and a Scotsman
James Bannerman, (1807-1868), Free Church of Scotland theologian
Murray Bannerman (born 1957), Canadian ice-hockey goaltender
Ronald Bannerman (1890–1978), New Zealand flying ace of World War I
Major General William Burney Bannerman (1858–1924), military surgeon
Yasmin Bannerman (born 1972), British actress

See also
Henry Campbell-Bannerman

English-language surnames
Ghanaian families
Scottish surnames